Siret Kotka (marriage name Siret Kotka-Repinski; born 27 July 1986 in Viljandi) is an Estonian politician and a member of Riigikogu. She represents the Lääne-Virumaa constituency as a member of the Estonian Centre Party.

On September 7, 2013 Kotka was elected to the party's board and later worked as an adviser to Tallinn Deputy Mayor Taavi Aas. In 2014 she was chosen to Riigikogu to replace convicted Ester Tuiksoo. Kotka was elected back to the Riigikogu in the 2015 election with 2,558 personal votes.

References

1986 births
21st-century Estonian politicians
21st-century Estonian women politicians
Estonian Centre Party politicians
Living people
Members of the Riigikogu, 2011–2015
Members of the Riigikogu, 2015–2019
Members of the Riigikogu, 2019–2023
People from Viljandi
Women members of the Riigikogu